Turkish Airlines Flight 158 was a scheduled domestic passenger flight from Istanbul Yeşilköy Airport to Ankara Esenboğa Airport, Turkey. On 16 January 1983, the aircraft operating the flight, a Boeing 727-200, landed about  short of the runway at its destination airport in driving snow, broke up, and caught fire. Of the 67 occupants on board, 47 perished.

Aircraft
The aircraft, a Boeing 727-2F2 with three Pratt & Whitney JT8D-15 turbofan jet engines, was built by Boeing with manufacturer serial number 21603/1389, and made its first flight in 1978.

Crew and passengers
The aircraft had 7 crew and 60 passengers on board. 47 passengers were killed. All members of the crew and 13 passengers survived the accident with injuries.

References

Aviation accidents and incidents in 1983
Aviation accidents and incidents in Turkey
1983 in Turkey
158
Airliner accidents and incidents involving controlled flight into terrain
Accidents and incidents involving the Boeing 727
Airliner accidents and incidents caused by weather
History of Ankara Province
January 1983 events in Europe